Clinton J. Conley is an American post-punk musician and journalist from Boston, Massachusetts, best known as a co-founder, bassist, and vocalist of Mission of Burma.

Early life and education 
Conley was born in Boston, Massachusetts and graduated from the University of Rochester in 1977.

Career 
Mission of Burma was active from 1979 to 1983. They found only limited success when signed to Ace of Hearts Records, but they have been re-assessed as one of the more influential American post-punk groups of their era. The band was cited as an influence for Pixies, Nirvana, and Pearl Jam. When the group broke up in 1983, Conley dropped out of music almost entirely for over a decade, earning a master's degree in broadcast journalism and going to work as a producer for WCVB-TV's news magazine program, Chronicle. He did, however, produce Yo La Tengo's 1986 debut album, Ride the Tiger.

With Mission of Burma, Conley played bass guitar and occasional guitar, and wrote and sang some of the group's best-known songs, such as "That's When I Reach For My Revolver" and "Academy Fight Song"—songs that often had an anthemic sing-along quality. Conley's bass work often featured double stops and chords.

In 2001, Conley formed a new group, Consonant, as lead vocalist and now playing primarily guitar. They released two albums. Conley said that playing in a band again helped him be more receptive to the idea of returning to his old one.

In 2002, Conley reunited with Roger Miller and Peter Prescott, and with Bob Weston of Shellac replacing original member Martin Swope, they began performing and recording as Mission of Burma. They have since released four albums, including 2009's The Sound the Speed the Light.

References

External links
Clint Conley on Twitter

Living people
American rock bass guitarists
American male bass guitarists
Musicians from Boston
Year of birth missing (living people)
Mission of Burma members
American male guitarists
American post-punk musicians
University of Rochester alumni